Oswaldo Palencia (born 1 February 1970) is a Venezuelan footballer. He played in 14 matches for the Venezuela national football team from 1993 to 1997. He was also part of Venezuela's squad for the 1993 Copa América tournament.

References

External links
 

1970 births
Living people
Venezuelan footballers
Venezuela international footballers
Place of birth missing (living people)
Association football forwards
Estudiantes de Mérida players
Carabobo F.C. players
Deportivo Cali footballers
Venezuelan expatriate footballers
Expatriate footballers in Colombia